Half Century Nunatak is a prominent nunatak, displaying a high east-facing rock escarpment, located  north of Dismal Buttress at the west side of upper Shackleton Glacier, Antarctica. It was named by the Southern Party of the New Zealand Geological Survey Antarctic Expedition (1961–62) which, near this nunatak, celebrated the 50th anniversary (half a century) of Amundsen reaching the South Pole.

References

Nunataks of the Ross Dependency
Dufek Coast